Wilfred Bowring Stoddart (27 April 1871 – 8 January 1935) was an English Rugby player and cricketer active from 1898 to 1899 who played for Lancashire. 

He was born in West Derby and died in Liverpool. Stoddart was a strong forward who played rugby for Lancashire and for England in all the 1897 internationals, one of only six men to do so.  As a cricketer, he appeared in 19 first-class matches as a righthanded batsman who bowled right arm leg break. He scored 410 runs with a highest score of 43* and held seven catches. He took 48 wickets with a best analysis of six for 121. His cousin was the cricketer Trevor Bowring.

His son, Sir Kenneth Stoddart was a distinguished Battle of Britain Pilot and later became Lord Lieutenant of Merseyside.

Notes

1871 births
1935 deaths
English cricketers
Gentlemen cricketers
Lancashire cricketers
Marylebone Cricket Club cricketers
England international rugby union players